Ethel & Ernest is a British animated biographical film directed by Roger Mainwood. The film is based on the 1998 graphic memoir of the same name written by Raymond Briggs, and follows Briggs' parents, Ethel and Ernest, through their period of marriage from the 1920s to their deaths in the 1970s. It was broadcast on television on BBC One on 28 December 2016.

Plot
The film details the marriage of Ethel and Ernest Briggs from the 1920s to the 1970s, as they live through extraordinary events occurring in that period.

Cast
 Jim Broadbent as Ernest Briggs
 Brenda Blethyn as Ethel Briggs
 Luke Treadaway as Raymond Briggs
 Harry Collett as young Raymond Briggs
 Roger Allam as Doctor Trotter
 Pam Ferris as Mrs. Bennett / Aunty Betty
 Virginia McKenna as Lady Foxworthy
 Peter Wight as Detective Sergeant Burnley
 June Brown as Ernest's Step Mother
 Simon Day as Alf

Production
The film was originally to be produced by John Coates, notable for producing The Snowman. When Coates died in 2012, Camilla Deakin and Ruth Fielding (Lupus Films) were then hired to help complete the film. The voice cast for the film was revealed on 3 August 2015. The film was made of 67,680 hand-drawn individual frames.

Release
The film made its official debut in the 60th BFI London Film Festival. The film made its theatrical premiere in the U.S. at the Nuart Landmark Theatre in Santa Monica, California, on 15 December 2017.

Reception

Critical response
The site's critical consensus reads, "Gentle, poignant, and vividly animated, Ethel & Ernest is a warm character study with an evocative sense of time and place." On Metacritic, which assigns a normalized rating, the film has a score of 72 out of 100, based on 10 critics, indicating "generally favorable reviews."

References

External links
 
 
 

2016 animated films
2016 films
2016 biographical drama films
British biographical drama films
British animated films
Films scored by Carl Davis
Films set in the 1920s
Films set in the 1930s
Films set in the 1940s
Films set in the 1950s
Films set in the 1960s
Films set in the 1970s
Films set in London
English-language Luxembourgian films
Luxembourgian animated films
Animated films based on novels
Films based on British novels
Animated films based on comics
Films based on British comics
BBC Film films
British Film Institute films
Vertigo Films films
Vertigo Films animated films
2016 drama films
2010s English-language films
2010s British films